The 2nd European Games 2019 (Jeŭrapiejskija huĺni 2019; , Yevropeyskiye igry 2019), informally known as Minsk 2019, was held in Minsk, Belarus, from 21 June to 30 June 2019. The games featured 200 events in 15 sports (23 disciplines). Around 4,000 athletes from 50 countries participated. Ten of the sports offered qualification opportunities for the 2020 Summer Olympics in Tokyo, Japan. The opening ceremony at the Dinamo Stadium was held on 21 June and the closing ceremony at the Dinamo Stadium was held on 30 June.

The logo of the games was "paparać-kvietka"—a plant that plays an important role in the culture of the Slavs. The slogan of the event is "Bright Year, Bright You", which also makes reference to the national domain of the Republic of Belarus and the official international shortening—BY.

Host selection

A number of countries and cities expressed their interest to host the second European Games in 2019 but only the Netherlands submitted an official bid. At the meeting of an Extraordinary General Assembly on 16 May 2015, the Netherlands was unanimously approved as host of the second edition of the Games. The competition intended to be nationwide and based in seven cities, including Amsterdam, The Hague, Eindhoven, Rotterdam, Utrecht. On 10 June 2015, the Netherlands announced their refusal to hold the second European Games after insufficient funding for the Games, projected to cost €57.5m. The European Olympic Committee president, Patrick Hickey said the news was "disappointing". Following this, a number of countries expressed interest in hosting the games: Belarus (Minsk), United Kingdom (Glasgow), Poland (Poznan), Russia (Kazan and Sochi), Turkey (Istanbul).

In November 2015, Russia was announced as a future host country for the II European Games. At the same time, the WADA began its investigation of the doping scandal in Russia which led to the IOC's refusal to support the holding of major sports events in Russia, including the second European Games.

During the meeting of the EOС General Assembly, held in Minsk on 21 October 2016, Minsk was selected as a host city for the second European Games. A contract was signed on 1 September 2017 by the chairman of the Minsk City Executive Committee Andrei Shorets, the president of the EOC Janez Kocijančič, the Minister of Sport and Tourism of Belarus Alexander Shamko, first Vice-President of the NOC of Belarus Andrey Astashevich, Director of the 2nd European Games 2019 Georgy Katulin, Secretary-General of the European Olympic Committees Rafael Pagnozzi.

Organising Committee
On 12 May 2017, the President of Belarus Alexander Lukashenko signed a decree on the Foundation of the Directorate of the II European Games 2019. The founders of the foundation are the National Olympic Committee, the Minsk City Executive Committee and the Ministry of Sports and Tourism. Georgy Katulin, General Secretary of the National Olympic Committee of the Republic of Belarus, was appointed the CEO of the foundation in August 2017.
In November 2017, the management launched the official website of the games.

In April 2019, Lukashenko announced that the Games were on budget and on time and that "everything should meet the highest standards". Sergei Rumas, Belarus's prime minister and the head of the Organising Committee also said that all the facilities would be finished by 15 May and that "95 per cent of the equipment has already been installed".

On 20 May 2019, Lukashenko signed Decree No.191, entitled "On security measures during the 2nd European Games in Belarus". It gave the Ministry of Defence the power to restrict access to certain areas and placed a ban on drones, unmanned aerial vehicles and model aeroplanes at competition venues. Drones and planes violating the decree will be seized until 2 July, when the Games end.

Volunteers
The start of the volunteer selection began in September 2017 during the "Dobrofest" and registration ended on 1 April 2019. In April 2019, the head of the volunteer network for the Games, Nadezhda Anisovets, said that the appeal resulted in 24,000 applications, much larger than the 8,000 needed for the Games. Most of them are students of Belarusian universities. Applications were also received from 52 other countries including Russia, Australia, the USA, Mexico, and Egypt. The basic requirements for the candidate are communication skills and high English-language proficiency. The selected volunteers will be involved in over 34 functional areas. Each volunteer will be given a special uniform, badges and souvenirs.

Opening ceremony
The Opening ceremony was held at National Olympic Stadium Dinamo and ran from 22:10 to 00:45 FET. It was produced by Russian company Art City 5, and was directed by Alexander Vavilov (Belarus) and Alexei Sechenov (Russia). Augmented reality imagery was used during the ceremony. The main musical performers were Anna Netrebko, Ilya Silchukov with Elena Salo and Dimash Kudaibergen. During the parade of nations, Greece entered the stadium first. The host nation Belarus marched last, while other countries entered in English alphabetical order. Each delegation is escorted by girls in dresses representing the Kupala wheel, a symbol of the sun for Eastern Slavs decorated with traditional Belarusian ornaments. Attending the ceremony was President Alexander Lukashenko, who opened the games, Janez Kocijančič of the European Olympic Committee, as well as other foreign delegations such as Igor Dodon representing Moldova, Aleksandar Vučić representing Serbia as well as Dmitry Medvedev and Ramzan Kadyrov representing Russia. Georgian President Salome Zourabichvili, who was due to attend the ceremony, left early due to the civil unrest in the Georgian capital of Tbilisi.

Closing ceremony
The Closing ceremony was held at National Olympic Stadium Dinamo and ran from 22:00 to 23:50 FET. In attendance were IOC President Thomas Bach, Russian President Vladimir Putin, Tajik President Emomali Rahmon, and Armenian President Armen Sarkissian.

Transportation
On 27 December 2017, it was announced about the finalising of the development of a comprehensive transport service plan for the competition, based on the needs of all stakeholders and the experience of the previous Olympic and European Games host cities: Beijing, London, Baku. The main goal of the developed plan is to optimise the routes in such a way that any participant can get to any stadium in no more than half an hour.
Rail services between Masyukovshchina (Minsk-Arena), Belarus (regatta course Zaslawye) and Loshitsa (Čyžoŭka-Arena) will operate with higher frequency during the event. In addition, the existing bus network will be expanded by 10 to 12 new routes to the competition sites, which will run up to 300 buses and trolleybuses.

In August 2018, new digital information boards were unveiled in order to improve the public transport network for foreign visitors. Valery Shkuratov, the director of Metropolitan Transport and Communications (the firm which manage the transit systems in the city), said that more than 270 displays had already been installed.

In October 2018, it was announced that the Minsk metro would have full 4G coverage by the time the Games began.
The next month, fourteen taxi companies in Minsk as well as several governmental and administrational departments signed a memorandum of understanding to guarantee fair prices during the Games. In March 2019, it was announced that the taxis adhering to the scheme would carry a logo to enable customers to identify them.

Venues

The Organising committee plans to involve already existed sports facilities after their renovation. The Opening and closing ceremonies, as well as competitions in track and field, will be held at the Dinamo Stadium (Minsk, Kirov, 8).

Athletes, team officials and other team personnel will stay on the grounds of Minsk University, which has the capacity to host up to 7,500 people. The students have been evicted for the duration of the Games and given alternative accommodation. Part of the village facilities has already been put into operation, part of it will be completed by April 2019. Each apartment has two bedrooms and can hold up to 4 people. The village also has a canteen, gym, merchandise store and cultural centre.

Participating countries
Fifty European Olympic Committees member countries competed at the games. Numbers in brackets denote the number of athletes being sent to the Games.

 
 
 
 
 
  (host)

Games
A total of 15 sports were presented: archery, athletics, badminton, basketball 3-on-3, beach football, boxing, canoe sprint, cycling, gymnastics, judo, karate, sambo, shooting, table tennis and wrestling. A number of disciplines were dropped after the 2015 European Games: all aquatics (diving, swimming, synchronised swimming and water polo), BMX racing, mountain biking, fencing, taekwondo, triathlon and all volleyball (beach volleyball and indoor volleyball). Ten of the sports offered qualification opportunities for the 2020 Summer Olympics in Tokyo, Japan.

  Archery (8)
  Athletics (10)
  Badminton (5)
  Basketball (3x3) (2)
  Beach soccer (1) 
  Boxing (15)
  Canoe sprint (16)
  Cycling
 Road cycling (4)
 Track cycling (20)
  Gymnastics
 Acrobatic (6)
 Aerobic (2)
 Artistic (12)
 Trampoline (4)
 Rhythmic (8)
  Judo (15)
  Karate (12) 
  Sambo (18) 
  Shooting (19)
  Table tennis (5)
  wrestling (18)
 Freestyle
 Greco-Roman 
 Women

Calendar
The competition schedule consists of 200 events. The agenda as the competition schedule may change.

Archery
At the 2019 European Games in Minsk, eight events of archery will be contested. Archers will shoot at the Olympic Sports Complex over seven days of competition. The 2019 Games will be the first to include compound archery.

Athletics
Athletics competitions will held be from 23 to 28 June at the Dinamo Stadium with a seating capacity of 22,000. Athletes will compete over six days in men's, women's and mixed track and fields events.

Badminton
Badminton competition will take place at the Falcon Club with a seating capacity of 2,000 from 24 to 30 June. The competition will be held over a seven-day period and include five medal events in men's and women's singles, men's and women's doubles and mixed.

Basketball 3x3 
Basketball competitions will be held from 21 to 24 June at the Palova Arena with a seating capacity of 1,000. The competition will take place in the half-court 3x3 format, and both the men's and women's tournaments will feature 128 athletes.

Beach soccer
The beach soccer tournament will be held from 25 to 29 June at the Olympic Sports Complex with a seating capacity of 1,500. Ninety-six male athletes will compete over five days of competition.

Boxing
Boxing competitions will be held from 21 to 30 June at the URUCHIE Sports Palace. The competition consists ten weights events for men and five for women.

Canoe sprint
Canoeing will be contested between 25 and 27 June at the ZASLAVL Regatta Course. A total of sixteen medal events in canoe and kayak across both genders will be held. The European Games will replace the 2019 Canoe Sprint European Championships. Therefore, the winners of each discipline will be considered as European Champion 2019.

Cycling
Two disciplines of cycling will be contested at the games: road cycling and track cycling. A total of 24 medal events will be held. Competitions on-road cycling will take place in Minsk city and region from 22 to 25 June. Competitions on track cycling will take place at Minsk Arena velodrome from 27 to 30 June. Road cycling will take place in Minsk City centre.

Gymnastics
Gymnastics at the games will be held in five categories: artistic gymnastics, rhythmic gymnastics, trampolining, acrobatics, and aerobics. All competitions will take place at the Minsk-Arena with a seating capacity of 8,000. The acrobatics competitions will take place from 22 to 23 June. The competition will be held over a two-day period and include six medal events in women's trios and mixed pairs. Competitions on aerobics will take place from 24 to 25 June. The competition will be held over a two-day period and include two medal events in mixed pairs and teams. The gymnastic trampoline competitions will take place from 24 to 25 June. The competition will be held over a two-day period and include four medal events. The artistic gymnastics will take place from 27 to 30 June. The competition will be held over a four-day period and include twelve medal events. The rhythmic gymnastics will take place from 22 to 23 June. The competition will be held over a two-day period and include eight medal events.

Judo
Judo competitions will be held from 22 to 25 June at the Čyžoŭka-Arena with a seating capacity of 8,800. The competition will consist of seven weight events and one team event in each gender; a total of 15 medal events. The European Games will replace the Judo European Championship.

Karate
Karate competitions will be held from 29 to 30 June at the Čyžoŭka-Arena with a seating capacity of 8,800. The competition will consist of twelve events, six in each gender—individual Kata and ten weighted Kumite.

Sambo
Sambo competitions will take place at the Minsk Sports Palace from 22 to 23 June and will consist of 18 events, nine in each gender.

Shooting
Shooting at the games will be held in two categories: shooting rifle and pistol and shooting shotgun. Competitions on shooting rifle and pistol will take place at the Shooting Center from 22 to 29 June. Competitions on shooting shotgun will take place at the Sporting Club from 22 to 28 June. In total, the competition will be held over an eight-day period and include nineteen medal events.

Table tennis
Table tennis will take place from 22 to 29 June at Tennis Olympic Center with a seating capacity of 1,000. Athletes will compete in five events.

Wrestling
The wrestling events will be held at the Minsk Sports Palace with a seating capacity 3,300 from 25 to 30 June. 18 events will be held, six events in freestyle for men, six events for women, and six in the Greco-Roman style for men.

Medal table

Marketing

Logo
The prototype for creating the 2nd European Games' logo in Minsk was the Kupala fire and "paparat-kvetka", which plays an important role in the Slavic culture. According to legend, "paparat-kvetka" blossoms once a year at midnight on Kupala Night. Anyone who sees this flowering will become the owner of unusual abilities and talents.

Mascot

In autumn of 2017, an open republican contest for the development of the mascot of the European Games was announced. Anyone could take part in the competition. Over 2,000 variants were collected from professionals and amateurs. The public presentation of the winning version took place in Minsk on 29 November 2018. The mascot chosen was a baby fox named "Lesik" who wears a shirt and shorts with the colours of the games' logo and wears shoes and a baseball hat with the games' slogan.

Lesik's story is based after The Little Prince, when after the Little Prince leaves Earth, Lesik the Fox misses his new friend and wants to make more. He learns of a legendary flower called the Paparats Kvetka which can help his dream come true, but he needs to travel 1 million steps to Belarus to find it. He represents friendship, development, harmony, discipline, determination, cheerfulness, invincibility and vigour, according to the mascot's creators.

Slogan
The slogan of the event is "Bright Year, Bright You!", which also successfully points to the national domain of the Republic of Belarus and the official international abbreviation BY. The Belarusian equivalent of the slogan is the phrase "", and the Russian is "", literally "Time for bright victories!"

Star Ambassadors

Darya Domracheva
Aliaksandr Bahdanovich
Aleksandr Medved
Volha Mazuronak
Rostislav Krimer
Alexandr Romankov
Ruslan Alekhno

Maria Vasilevich
Askold Zapashny
Edgard Zapashny
Tunzala Agayeva
Ani Lorak
Alexei Yagudin
Nellie Kim

Torch relay
The torch relay "Flame of Peace" was planned for before the games. In addition to traditional running with a torch, there were also creative performances organised along the route. The torch relay will last for 50 days and will cover 7,700 km. The relay will include 450 torchbearers, 100 volunteers and 10 flame keepers. The torch relay will begin on 3 May in Rome.

The torch itself was designed by Yulia Braychuk, weighs 1.7 kg and is 81 cm tall. It is made from stainless steel and can be attached to a bike or wheelchair.

Route

3 May (day 1)
Rome
4 May (day 2)
Courmayeur
5-7 May
Mont Blanc (5-7 May)
Courmayeur (Return after descent on 7 May)
8 May (day 3)
Ljubljana
9 May (day 4)
Vienna
Budapest
10 May (day 5)
Bratislava
Brno
11 May (day 6)
Warsaw
12 May (day 7)
Brest
13 May (day 8)
Skoki
14 May (day 9)
Kamyanyets
Belovezhskaya Pushcha National Park
15 May (day 10)
Pinsk
16 May (day 11)
Kudrichi
Mikashevichy
17 May (day 12)
Baranavichy
Kosava
18 May (day 13)
Grodno
19 May (day 14)
Augustów Canal
20 May (day 15)
Vawkavysk
21 May (day 16)
Mir
Navahrudak
22 May (day 17)
Byarozawka
Lida
23 May (day 18)
Oginski Family Estate and Museum
Astravyets
Gervyaty
24 May (day 19)
Vitebsk
25 May (day 20)
Polatsk
Navapolatsk
26 May (day 21)
Yelnya
Braslaw
27 May (day 22)
Mosar
Hlybokaye
28 May (day 23)
Lepel
29 May (day 24)
Orsha
30 May (day 25)
Mogilev
31 May (day 26)
Shkloŭ
Aleksandryia
1 June (day 27)
Horki
2 June (day 28)
Slawharad
Bychaŭ
Chigirinsky reservoir
3-4 June (day 29, 30)
Babruysk
5-6 June (day 31, 32)
Gomel
7 June (day 33)
Žlobin
Krasnyy Bereg
8 June (day 34)
Pripyatsky National Park
9 June (day 35)
Turaŭ
10 June (day 36)
Mazyr
11 June (day 37)
Salihorsk
12 June (day 38)
Niasviž
Mound of Glory
13 June (day 39)
Barysaw
Zhodzina
14 June (day 40)
Lahoysk
Khatyn Memorial
15 June (day 41)
Maladzyechna
16 June (day 42)
Stalin Line
Zasłaŭje
17-20 June (day 43, 44, 45, 46, 47)
Minsk
21 June (day 48)
Olympic Stadium

Promotion

Selfie contest
The deadline for submitting the selfie photos was October 2018. The criteria for evaluating photos include compliance with the theme and conditions of the contest, as well as artistic taste and originality. The final results were to be announced in late December 2018; however, the competition was extended to the 31 December. It was then later announced that the deadline would be extended again to the 25 February 2019.

The winners were awarded diplomas from Belteleradiocompany, as well as sets of tickets for the events of the European Games in Minsk and the official gear of the National Team of the Republic of Belarus. It happened on 21 June, nearly 30 minutes prior to Opening Ceremony of the Games.

Sponsors
Sponsorship was approved as one of the sources to reduce the number of budgetary funds for the games according to the decree of the President of the Republic of Belarus of 12 May 2017 «On the Directorate of the second European Games 2019».
On 15 December 2017, the official sponsor of the games became the operator of electronic interactive games «Sport Pari».
On 22 December 2017, it was announced that the telecommunication operator velcom is the official telecommunication partner of the 2nd European Games of 2019.

In March 2019, the Games' Organising Committee signed a memorandum of understanding with UNAIDS to strengthen co-operation in promoting safe lifestyles, preventing the spread of HIV/AIDS and eliminating discrimination around the infection.

Stamps
On 1 February 2019, Belposhta, the Belarusian postal service, released the official stamps for the Games. The four designs depict a cyclist, a runner, a rower and a dancer and were designed by Marina Vitkovskaya, with 120,000 sets being printed. There was an official cancellation ceremony in Minsk City Hall on the day of release.

Broadcasting rights
In February 2019, International Sports Broadcasting, a Spanish firm, was chosen as the host broadcaster for the Games, beating Match TV and Medialuso-Mediapro. The company had previously broadcast the 1st European Games in Baku. In March 2019, ISB was allowed to sell global broadcasting rights for the Games, with around 117 countries that have already been granted viewing rights. ISB and the Games' organisers have expressed that they hope to broadcast to more than 160 countries.

Europe

  – Tring Media
  – AzTV
  - BTRC
  – ČT sport
  – DR
  – Teledeporte
  – La chaine L'Équipe
  – BT Sport
  – 1TV, 2TV
  – ERT
  – M4
  – Sky Sport
  – RTK
  – Polsat
  – Sport TV
  – TVR
  – Match TV
  – RTV Slo 2
  – STV 2
  – Sportstv
  – Inter Media Group

Asia-Pacific and the Americas
 46 countries in the region including United States, Australia, Japan, Philippines, South Korea and Brazil – Olympic Channel
  – China Central Television

Cultural Program
The European Games featured a cultural program that included historical European martial arts. The program consisted of a tournament with 28 unique nations from 3 continents competing in 4 different weapon categories. Also, there was an exhibition of rare, original swords, fencing treatises, and martial arts paraphernalia from the 15th through the early 20th centuries. The exhibition also featured a conference of lectures and presentations from scholars on historical martial arts on 21 June 2019.

Art exhibition
On 7 June 2019, an exhibition celebrating the Games and its cultural legacy called "The High Art of Sport", opened at the National Centre for Contemporary Arts in Minsk. The exhibition contained more than 500 items, including materials from the Belarusian State Archive and works from artists from 11 of the competing countries. It was to be run until 4 August.

References

External links

 
 Travel advice for British nationals travelling to Belarus for the European Games
 General information about 2019 European games for expats and tourists

 
2019
2019 in multi-sport events
2019 in European sport
International sports competitions hosted by Belarus
Sports competitions in Minsk
2019 European Games
June 2019 sports events in Europe
2019 in Belarusian sport